Scott Barley (born 11 November 1992) is a Welsh filmmaker, artist, drone musician, and author.

His films have been associated with the Remodernist and Slow cinema movements, and ecocriticism. Recurrent themes in his work are the anthropocene, nature, darkness, cosmology, phenomenology, mereology and mysticism. His filmmaking methods have been compared to David Lynch, Stan Brakhage, Philippe Grandrieux, Béla Tarr, Alexander Sokurov, Maya Deren and Jean Epstein.

Since early 2015, Barley has almost exclusively shot his films on iPhone. He is most well-known for the 2017 experimental film, Sleep Has Her House. Danish film critic, and former director of the European Documentary Network, Tue Steen Müller has described him as the "Anselm Kiefer of cinema".

Influences and style
Barley's imagery and focus on natural landscape has been likened to the romantic tradition of The Sublime within a modernist and digital context. Critics and academics have drawn parallels with Sleep Has Her House and the work of Caspar David Friedrich, J. M. W. Turner, Johann Wolfgang von Goethe, Wagner's Götterdämmerung and the ideas of Immanuel Kant, among others.

Barley's approach to filmmaking is similar to that of other solo and poetic avant-garde filmmakers, Stan Brakhage, Jonas Mekas, Nathaniel Dorsky and Peter Hutton, but the post-production process is unique to both mainstream and avant-garde filmmaking practices."I always begin a film almost like one would keep a diary. I have no idea, or agenda to make a film. I simply document. I shoot what attracts me, random things, animals, variances in light, the water, the stars; simply what draws me in on different days, different nights, in different places. Once I have built up a body of footage, I start to see connections. These pieces of footage could be taken months or even years apart – and miles apart too. [I] then invisibly stitch [the different shots] together into one larger shot or sequence. But these connections between different pieces of footage all happen organically. I never force these connections. I never force a film when it doesn’t come. The films find me – not the other way round [...] All my films have been made this way. Some happen quicker than others. Once these connections are established, a narrative - through images - begins to germinate."

Filmography

Music

References

External links
 
 

Living people
British experimental filmmakers
1992 births